Meg Macdonald (born 28 June 1998) is an Australian rules footballer playing for the Richmond Football Club in the AFL Women's (AFLW). Macdonald signed with Richmond in January 2022 as a replacement player for Hannah McLaren who was placed on the clubs inactive list. She made her debut against  at Punt Road in the second round of the 2022 season.

Statistics
Statistics are correct to round 2, 2022

|- style="background-color: #eaeaea"
! scope="row" style="text-align:center" | 2022
|style="text-align:center;"|
| 38 || 1 || 0 || 0 || 1 || 0 || 1 || 0 || 0 || 0 || 0 || 1 || 0 || 1 || 0 || 0
|- 
|- class="sortbottom"
! colspan=3| Career
! 1
! 0
! 0
! 1
! 0
! 1
! 0
! 0
! 0
! 0
! 1
! 0
! 1
! 0
! 0
|}

References

External links
 
 

1998 births
Living people
Richmond Football Club (AFLW) players
Australian rules footballers from Victoria (Australia)